Ujalhati is a village in Fulbaria Upazila, Mymensingh District, Mymensingh Division, Bangladesh.

References

Populated places in Mymensingh District
Villages in Mymensingh District
Villages in Mymensingh Division